Jangal is a city in Razavi Khorasan Province, Iran.

Jangal may also refer to:
Jangal, Hormozgan, a village in Hormozgan Province, Iran
Jangal Tir Ahmad, a village in Hormozgan Province, Iran
Jangal, Khash, a village in Sistan and Baluchestan Province, Iran
Jangal, Qasr-e Qand, a village in Sistan and Baluchestan Province, Iran
Jangal-e Mukan, a village in Sistan and Baluchestan Province, Iran
Jangal, South Khorasan, a village in South Khorasan Province, Iran
Jangal District, an administrative subdivision of Razavi Khorasan Province, Iran
Jangal Rural District (disambiguation), administrative subdivisions in Iran
 an area of India; see History of Bikaner
 Jangal (magazine), a political magazine
 Jangal, Nadia, a census town in West Bengal, India 
Jangal, Tajikistan, a village near Panjakent, Tajikistan